Don't Give Up may refer to:

Film
 Don't Give Up (film), a 1947 Swedish musical film

Music

Albums
 Don't Give Up (album), a 2007 album by Serengeti & Polyphonic
 Don't Give Up, a 1981 album by Andraé Crouch
 "Don't Give Up", a 2014 album by Rick Seguso

Songs
 "Don't Give Up" (Chicane song), featuring Bryan Adams
 "Don't Give Up" (Island Inspirational All-Stars song), a song by Kirk Franklin, Hezekia Walker, Donald Lawrence, and Karen Clark Sheard
 "Don't Give Up" (Noisettes song)
 "Don't Give Up" (Peter Gabriel and Kate Bush song), covered by Shannon Noll and Natalie Bassingthwaighte
 "Don't Give Up" (Sanctus Real song)
 "You Are Loved (Don't Give Up)", a song by Josh Groban
 "Don't Give Up", by Eagle-Eye Cherry from Sub Rosa
 "Don't Give Up", by Ira Losco from Butterfly
 "Don't Give Up", by Peter Andre from Angels & Demons
 "Don't Give Up", by Petula Clark from Petula
 "Don't Give Up", by Preeya Kalidas
 "Don't Give Up", by White Lion from Pride
 “Don't Give Up (On The Brink Of A Miracle)”, by Tammy Faye Bakker
 "Don't Give Up (Don't Let Go)", a song by H & Claire, B-side of the single "Half a Heart"
 "Don't Give Up", by The Whitest Boy Alive from Dreams
 "Don't Give Up", by Washed Out from Paracosm
 "Don't Give Up", a track from the soundtrack of the 2015 video game Undertale by Toby Fox

See also
 Don't Give It Up (disambiguation)